"Hymn of Heaven" is a song by American contemporary Christian musician Phil Wickham. The song was released on February 11, 2022, as the third single from Wickham's eighth studio album, Hymn of Heaven (2021). Wickham co-wrote the song with Bill Johnson, Brian Johnson, and Chris Davenport. Jonathan Smith produced the single.

"Hymn of Heaven" peaked at number two on the US Hot Christian Songs chart. The song won the GMA Dove Award for Worship Recorded Song of the Year at the 2022 GMA Dove Awards. The song also received a nomination for the Grammy Award for Best Contemporary Christian Music Performance/Song at the 2023 Grammy Awards.

Background
Phil Wickham shared the story behind the song, saying: "The song is all about bringing heaven to this moment, with the way we act, and the way we speak, and the way we live, letting Jesus be the king and his rule, and his way taking over."

On February 11, 2021, Wickham also released the radio version of the song. The radio team of Fair Trade Services announced that "Hymn of Heaven" will be serviced to Christian radio in the United States, the official add date for the single slated on March 25, 2022.

Composition

Reception

Critical response
Jonathan Andre, reviewing for 365 Days of Inspiring Media review, saying "Hymn of Heaven" was one of the songs from Hymn of Heaven which "the potential to be powerful songs sung in churches around the world." Kevin Davis of NewReleaseToday also shared a similar sentiment, saying it was one of the songs on the albums that worship leaders would want to add to their set-lists immediately. Timothy Yap of JubileeCast commented on the song in his review: "it has a strong hymnic structure with well-crafted words that speak of the day we will meet Christ face to face." Jesus Freak Hideout's Josh Balogh opined in his review: "The title track, "Hymn of Heaven," is anthemic, with a big assist from a chorus of backing voices pushing the song ever higher."

Accolades

Commercial performance
"Hymn of Heaven" debuted at number 25 on the US Hot Christian Songs chart dated July 10, 2021, concurrently charting at number six on the Christian Digital Song Sales chart. The song 

"Hymn of Heaven" made its debut at number 43 on the US Christian Airplay chart dated April 2, 2022.

"Hymn of Heaven" made its debut at number 26 on the US Christian AC chart dated April 23, 2022.

Music videos
The official music video as well as the lyric video and audio video of "Hymn of Heaven" were all published on Phil Wickham's YouTube channel on June 25, 2021. On January 17, 2022, Essential Worship released the Song Session video of the song performed by Wickham through YouTube.

Charts

Weekly charts

Year-end charts

Release history

Other versions
 Bethel Music released a duet cover of the song, led by Brian Johnson and Zahriya Zachary, on their collective album, Homecoming (2021).

References

External links
 
 

2021 songs
2022 singles
Contemporary Christian songs
Phil Wickham songs
Songs written by Phil Wickham